Black NASA is a New Jersey-based rock band, often placed in the stoner rock genre. They formed in the early 2000s in Long Branch, and were active while the guitarist in Kosnik's other band (The Atomic Bitchwax) was busy with Monster Magnet. The band has a heavy 70s feel. They have not been active since touring to support Deuce. The band's name refers to NASA conspiracies in general, and is unrelated to the Old Negro Space Program.
Duane Hutter and Corey Stubblefield have been playing a new band called 40 POUND HOUND since 2014.

Members
 Chris Kosnik – bass, Vox, guitar, synthesizer (of Godspeed and The Atomic Bitchwax)
 Duane Hutter – guitar, slide guitar, dobro, harmonica (of Daysleeper and Solace)
 Corey Stubblefeld – drums, percussion (of Three Day Funk, Viscosity Jones and Muffled Crap)

Discography 
Black NASA (2002) Tee Pee Records
Deuce (2004) MeteorCity

Compilations 
Sucking the 70's (2002) Small Stone Records

References

Heavy metal musical groups from New Jersey
Musical groups from New Jersey
American stoner rock musical groups
2000 establishments in New Jersey
2005 disestablishments in New Jersey
Musical groups established in 2000
Musical groups disestablished in 2005